Frantz Kruger (born 22 May 1975 in Kempton Park, South Africa) is a South African born Finnish discus thrower who won the Olympic bronze medal in 2000. He is also a double African champion. His personal best throw of 70.32 metres, achieved in May 2002 in Salon-de-Provence, is the current African record.

He was married to Finnish former triple jumper Heli Koivula Kruger (divorced 2016), and received Finnish citizenship in 2007. Kruger has been available to represent Finland by a special permit from the government of IAAF since 20 August 2007. In international discus competition at Helsingborg, he set a new Finnish discus record, 69.97 metres.

Competition record

See also
List of eligibility transfers in athletics

References

External links

1975 births
Living people
People from Kempton Park, Gauteng
White South African people
Finnish male discus throwers
South African male discus throwers
Athletes (track and field) at the 1998 Commonwealth Games
Athletes (track and field) at the 2002 Commonwealth Games
Athletes (track and field) at the 2000 Summer Olympics
Athletes (track and field) at the 2004 Summer Olympics
Athletes (track and field) at the 2008 Summer Olympics
Olympic athletes of South Africa
Olympic athletes of Finland
Olympic bronze medalists for South Africa
Commonwealth Games gold medallists for South Africa
Commonwealth Games silver medallists for South Africa
Commonwealth Games medallists in athletics
Medalists at the 2000 Summer Olympics
Olympic bronze medalists in athletics (track and field)
Finnish people of South African descent
African Games gold medalists for South Africa
African Games medalists in athletics (track and field)
Universiade medalists in athletics (track and field)
Goodwill Games medalists in athletics
Athletes (track and field) at the 1999 All-Africa Games
Universiade gold medalists for South Africa
Medalists at the 1999 Summer Universiade
Naturalized citizens of Finland
South African expatriate sportspeople in Finland
Sportspeople from Gauteng
Competitors at the 2001 Goodwill Games
Medallists at the 1998 Commonwealth Games
Medallists at the 2002 Commonwealth Games